Mercurio Bua (some modern sources use Buia) was an Albanian condottiero (stratioti captain) active in Italy. His father was Peter Bua, leader of the Albanians in the Morea in the 15th century. Born in Nauplia in 1478, Mercurio Bua moved to Venice in 1489 after his father's death and participated in the important phases of the Italian Wars serving the Republic of Venice, the Duke of Milan Ludovico Sforza, the Kingdom of France, the Holy Roman Emperor Maximilian I and then again Venice. For his deeds the King of France Louis XII rewarded him with the honorary title Count of Aquino and Roccasecca.

Life 

Born in Nafplion in the Peloponnese, Mercurio was the son of Peter Bua ( 1450s), who belonged to the Albanian noble family of Bua that settled in Peloponnese, and who was the leader of the Albanian community of the region after the fall of the Despotate of the Morea.

As accounted by Giovanni Andrea Saluzzo, Lord of Castellar who participated in the Battle of Novara in 1500 as a trusted man of the marquess Ludovico II of Saluzzo against the Duke of Milan Ludovico il Moro, the Albanian captain Mercurio, who at that time was serving the Duke of Milan, was captured in Novara by a certain Duncan after the defeat of Ludovico il Moro. Taken into the prisons of Castellar for a few weeks, Mercurio was then liberated by Giovanni Andrea Saluzzo in June 6, 1500.

Due to his martial prowess, he was eventually made Count of Aquino and Roccasecca.

A letter written by Bua has survived. He wrote it in June 17, 1506 and directed to the treasury administration of the court of France as the capitaine de cent hommes de guerre de cheval albanoys ("Captain of 100 Albanian cavalrymen and men-of-war") in relation to the payment of his company.

In 1508, according to the chronicler Ambrogio da Paullo, he was challenged to a duel by the twenty-two-year-old Faccendino Sanseverino (sometimes identified as the son of Roberto Sanseverino, actually nephew of Antonio Maria), who wanted to defend the honor of the Duke of Ferrara and the Marquis of Mantua, for certain insulting words spoken by Mercurio. Mercurio, knowing him as "a young expert and a strong man in arms" and doubting "not to lose his honor to fight with him", preferred to ambush him with 25 stradioti on the road from Melegnano to San Donato Milanese. They gave him more than thirty wounds, "so that the poor young man, as he came to defend the honor of the marquises and so his own, miserably remained dead." Mercury was reproached for having done so "out of cowardice more than anything else, unde was forced to flee with great scorn and shame [...] and so Facendino lost his life and Mercurio the conduct, as he had with the roy, and the honor".

Mercurio Bua died in Treviso, (Italy) between 1542-45, where earlier he served as captain of a unit of 50 soldiers. He is buried in Santa Maria Maggiore in the same city near the tomb of his wife. In 1562 a marble monument was erected on his tomb, made by Antonio Lombardo. In 1637 the following inscription was made on the monument:

"Mercurio Bua Comiti E. Principibus PeloponnesiEpirotarum Equitum Ductori,Anno Salu. MDCXXXVII."

Which means "To Count Mercurio Bua, Prince of Peloponnesus, Leader of the Epirote Horsemen, Year of our Salvation, 1637".
The monument also lists some of his military career.

Marriages and children 
His first marriage was in 1519 with Maria Boccali, the daughter of Niccolò Boccali. The Boccali came from the Morea and were related to branches of Skanderbeg's family and of the Arianiti family, as well as the Byzantine imperial family of the Palaiologi. The Boccali too provided for generations very valiant and loyal fighters to Venice. Maria always lived in Venice, even when Mercurio served the Holy Roman Empire. Maria died in 1524 leaving one son with the name Flavio. She was buried in Santa Maria di Treviso. In 1525 Mercurio married Elisabetta, daughter of Alvise Balbi. With her Mercurio had four children: Helena Maria, Curio, Polyxena and Alessandro. Elizabeth died in or before 1528.

In culture 

The life of Bua had been dramatised in the works of Tzanes Koronaios (Zanetto Coroneo). Koronaios, who had been stradiotti-troubadour of Zantiote origin, was a companion of Mercurio Bua.  In his work, a long epic poem in vernacular Greek on the exploits, bravery and military victories of Mercurio Bua, Koronaios gives Bua's mythological pedigree, which includes Achilles, Alexander the Great and Pyrrhus. A possible answer on why this work was written in Greek and not in Italian or even medieval Albanian would be that the close environment of Mercurio Bua spoke primarily Greek, retained its Byzantine traditions and cultural identity. In this work he was praised as "chosen among the Hellenes" or in another verse as "rampart of the Albanians" 
This poem was found in a manuscript in Italy and was published partially by C. Hopf and in its entirety by Constantine Sathas. It was written in 1519 when Koronaios was in Venice and refers to Bua's history till 1517. It consists of about 4.500 rhyming verses and contains valuable historical information. Koronaios wrote and sent to Bua also a smaller poem (“pittakion”) of about 125 verses in Greek language, too.

Another mention of a Mercurio Bua exists in the Histoire des guerres civiles de France by Enrico Caterino Davila. There a man named Mercurio Bua was active in the service of the king of France in the 1580s. He was present as a commander of a unit of light cavalry at the Battle of Coutras in 1587, leading an ill-fated cavalry charge that led to his unit being diverted away from the decisive action, thus contributing to a catastrophic defeat of the royal army. Nevertheless, it is unknown if it is the same person.

Sources

Citations

Bibliography

External links
 Military career of Mercurio Bua

1478 births
1542 deaths
Arvanites
15th-century Albanian people
16th-century Albanian people
16th-century condottieri
People from Nafplion
Counts of the Holy Roman Empire
Republic of Venice military personnel
m
Venetian Albanians
Stratioti